Syntypistis parcevirens is a species of moth of the family Notodontidae first described by Joseph de Joannis in 1929. It is found in Vietnam, Myanmar and the Chinese provinces of Fujian, Hubei, Hunan, Sichuan, Yunnan, Shaanxi and Gansu.

References

Moths described in 1929
Notodontidae